Jerusalem railway station may refer to:

 Jerusalem–Khan railway station, the oldest such station (1892–1998)
 Jerusalem–Malha railway station (2005–2020)
 Jerusalem–Yitzhak Navon railway station (2018–present)

See also
 :Category:Railway stations in Jerusalem